Caio Campos Souza (born 12 September 1993) is a Brazilian male artistic gymnast and part of the national team. He participated at the 2015 World Artistic Gymnastics Championships in Glasgow. He competed at the 2020 Summer Olympics.

References

External links

1993 births
Living people
Brazilian male artistic gymnasts
Place of birth missing (living people)
Gymnasts at the 2015 Pan American Games
Gymnasts at the 2019 Pan American Games
Pan American Games gold medalists for Brazil
Pan American Games silver medalists for Brazil
Pan American Games bronze medalists for Brazil
Pan American Games medalists in gymnastics
South American Games gold medalists for Brazil
South American Games silver medalists for Brazil
South American Games bronze medalists for Brazil
South American Games medalists in gymnastics
Competitors at the 2018 South American Games
Medalists at the 2015 Pan American Games
Medalists at the 2019 Pan American Games
Gymnasts at the 2020 Summer Olympics
Olympic gymnasts of Brazil
Sportspeople from Rio de Janeiro (state)
21st-century Brazilian people